Ward Springs is an unincorporated community in Birchdale Township, Todd County, Minnesota, United States. It is along State Highway 28 (MN 28) near Todd County Roads 2 and 19. Nearby places include Grey Eagle, Melrose, and Sauk Centre.

History
Ward Springs was originally called Birch Lake City. The present name is for the community's founders, J. W. and Martha J. Ward. A post office called Birch Lake was established in 1882, the name was changed to Ward Springs in 1909, and the post office closed in 1959.

References

Unincorporated communities in Todd County, Minnesota
Unincorporated communities in Minnesota